Leroy Gilbert Denman (October 31, 1855 – September 14, 1916) was a justice of the Supreme Court of Texas from July 1894 to May 1899. Leesville, Texas, is majorly encompassed by his remaining landed estate and legacy.

References

Justices of the Texas Supreme Court
1855 births
1916 deaths
19th-century American judges